Fowlers Hollow State Park is a  Pennsylvania state park in Toboyne Township, Perry County, Pennsylvania in the United States. Fowlers Hollow State Park is on the site of a former sawmill, and was developed as a park by the Works Progress Administration during the Great Depression.

History
The land on which Fowlers Hollow State Park sits was clear cut during the early 1900s (decade). The Perry Lumber Company built a narrow-gauge railroad on the former Path Valley Railroad bed from New Germantown to the area of what is now Big Spring State Forest Picnic Area. The lumber company never built a permanent sawmill in the area. Instead they used five portable mills. Lumber was cut and bark was stripped from the hemlock. The standing lumber was quickly exhausted and logging operations were complete in the area by 1905. The state of Pennsylvania bought  from the Perry Lumber Company in 1907. Construction of the park facilities took place during the Great Depression by works of the Works Progress Administration.

Recreation
Fowlers Hollow State Park is used by families on picnics and outdoor enthusiasts seeking to hunt, fish, snowmobile, and ski within the park and in the nearby Tuscarora State Forest. The picnic facilities at the park have stone fireplaces that were built by the CCC. Fowler Hollow Run passes through the park and is a brown trout fishery.  There are 18 campsites at the park: twelve are for trailers, and six for tents. It also serves as a trailhead for the trail system of the Tuscarora State Forest. Hunters, snowmobilers, and cross-country skiers also use the park to gain access to the surrounding state forest.

Nearby state parks
The following state parks are within  of Fowlers Hollow State Park:
Big Spring State Forest Picnic Area (Perry County)
Caledonia State Park (Adams and Franklin Counties)
Colonel Denning State Park (Cumberland County)
Cowans Gap State Park (Fulton County)
Greenwood Furnace State Park (Huntingdon County)
Kings Gap Environmental Education and Training Center (Cumberland County)
Little Buffalo State Park (Perry County)
Mont Alto State Park (Franklin County)
Pine Grove Furnace State Park (Cumberland County)

References

External links

  

State parks of Pennsylvania
Protected areas established in 1936
Civilian Conservation Corps in Pennsylvania
Works Progress Administration in Pennsylvania
Parks in Perry County, Pennsylvania
Campgrounds in Pennsylvania
1936 establishments in Pennsylvania
Protected areas of Perry County, Pennsylvania